Cerro Duida, named Yennamadi by the ye'kwana, is a very large tepui in Amazonas state, Venezuela. At its foot lies the small settlement of La Esmeralda, from which the mountain can be climbed.

Cerro Duida shares a common base with the much smaller (but taller) Cerro Marahuaca, located off its northeastern flank, and together they form the Duida–Marahuaca Massif. Both tepuis are entirely within the bounds of Duida-Marahuaca National Park. Sandwiched between them, a massive ridge known as Cerro Petaca rises to at least . The much lower Cerro Huachamacari, derived from a separate base, lies to the northwest of this complex.

Tyler-Duida expedition
George Henry Hamilton Tate led a major expedition of the American Museum of Natural History to Cerro Duida in 1928–1929. Named the Tyler-Duida Expedition, it was the first to reach the mountain's summit plateau and the first to climb a tepui of the Venezuelan Amazon. Mount Duida frog was first collected during the expedition and is still not known from anywhere else, although it was formally described only 40 years later. Although primarily a zoological expedition, much plant material was collected. These herbarium collections were studied extensively by Henry Gleason, who formally described many of the mountain's plant species in a series of papers published in 1931. This was followed by a number of important botanical explorations of Cerro Duida, first by Julian A. Steyermark in 1944 and later by Bassett Maguire in 1949 and 1950.

See also
 Distribution of Heliamphora
 Duida grass finch

References

Further reading

 Chapman, F.M. (July 1931). Problems of the Roraima-Duida region as presented by the bird life. Geographical Review 21(3): 363–372. 

Tepuis of Venezuela
Mountains of Venezuela
Geography of Amazonas (Venezuelan state)